Great Bend is a borough in Susquehanna County, Pennsylvania, United States,  north of Scranton. According to 2020 Census data, Great Bend's population was 634, down 13.6% from 2010. Great Bend sits along the Susquehanna River, less than two miles (about 3 km) from the New York State border, and is located directly off Interstate 81. Several small manufacturers also call Great Bend home. Great Bend is considered a bedroom community of the Binghamton, NY metropolitan area. The borough has three public parks. Billy Greenwood Memorial Park on Kilrow Avenue and Veterans' Memorial Park on Spring St. overlook the Susquehanna River. Great Bend is within the Blue Ridge School District.

History

Great Bend Borough was incorporated on November 19, 1861 from parts of Great Bend Township. Great Bend was named from a bend in the Susquehanna River.

Geography
Great Bend is located at  (41.973226, -75.744376).

Demographics

As of the census of 2010, there were 734 people, 341 households, and 194 families residing in the borough. The racial makeup of the borough was 97.7% White, 0.4% Asian, 0.3% some other race, and 1.6% two or more races. Hispanic or Latino of any race composed 1.4% of the population.

There were 341 households, out of which 22.6% had children under the age of 18 living with them, 41.1% were married couples living together, 10% had a female householder with no husband present, and 43.1% were non-families. 36.1% of all households were made up of individuals, and 18.5% had someone living alone who was 65 years of age or older. The average household size was 2.15 and the average family size was 2.74.

In the borough the population was spread out, with 19.8% under the age of 18, 59.1% from 18 to 64, and 21.1% who were 65 years of age or older. The median age was 46 years.

The median income for a household in the borough was $41,776, and the median income for a family was $52,381. Males had a median income of $33,750 versus $29,138 for females. The per capita income for the borough was $21,634. About 1.2% of families and 6.3% of the population were below the poverty line, including 3.5% of those under age 18 and 8.9% of those age 65 or over.

Notable people
Charles L. Catlin, Wisconsin state legislator and lawyer, was born in Great Bend.
Fanny DuBois Chase (1828–1902), social reformer and author
Sylvia Dubois (1778/89 - 1888), African-American woman born into slavery, became free after striking her mistress while living in Great Bend

References

External links

Boroughs in Susquehanna County, Pennsylvania
Populated places established in 1861
Pennsylvania populated places on the Susquehanna River
1861 establishments in Pennsylvania